The 1990 Bohol earthquake occurred on February 8, 1990 at 15:15:32 (UTC +8) which had a magnitude of 6.8 . The earthquake had a moderate depth of 25.9 km (16 mi). Most of the damage was observed in the province of Bohol. A tsunami hit the southeastern coastline of Bohol and the island of Camiguin. There were 6 deaths, over 200 injuries and an estimated ₱157 million ($7 million) in total damages reported.

Twenty-three years later, a much more devastating 7.2 Mw under the same fault system would strike the island killing 222 individuals.

Tectonic Setting
The Philippines is usually prone to earthquakes due to its location within the Pacific Ring of Fire, where most of the world's seismological events occur. The Bohol Sea is home to segments of the Philippine Fault System, a system of fault line extending from the Northwestern province of Ilocos Sur, transversing through Quezon province, Masbate Island and the Eastern Visayas region, and ending at the end of Davao Gulf. The fault that had ruptured suggested a northeast-southwest trending nodal plane. However, overlaying layers of milocene dated limestone suggested that the fault was inactive for numerous years.

Earthquake
The epicentre of the quake was located 17 km southeast of Tagbilaran City and was due to the rupture of an unknown normal fault line offshore Bohol island. The ruptures have caused dipping in a southeastern direction. It recorded a moment magnitude of 6.7–6.8, measuring an Intensity of VII (Destructive) on the PHIVOLCS Intensity Scale, as well as a maximum intensity of VIII (Damaging tremor) on the Rossi-Forrel scale recorded in Tagbilaran City.

Approximately 30 minutes after the mainshock, an aftershock with a close magnitude of 6.6 occurred near the same area, with a different slip pattern, directing in a northwestward direction. The said aftershock caused some damage and further worsened the conditions from the already affected buildings.

Tsunami 
The rupture from the unknown fault that caused tsunami waves reported as high as 2 meters hitting the surrounding islands nearby. There were no damage reported from the waves.

Casualties and damage
Damage was mostly sustained by the Eastern and Southeastern Coastline of Bohol most of which were due to poorly built infrastructure that couldn't stand such strong movement. Estimates say that about 3,000 units of houses and other structures as well as 182 of which were totally demolished such as a bridge connecting the towns of Jagna and Duero and roads to the town of Anda. Landslides, Fissures, multiple Mud Volcanoes, and a drastic increase of sea levels were observed in particular places near the epicenter. The total cost is estimated at ₱157 million ($7 million).

There were 6 confirmed deaths from the quake and at least 200 injuries. A further 46,000 were displaced and 7,000 homeless.

See also
List of earthquakes in 1990
2013 Bohol earthquake
List of earthquakes in the Philippines
Bohol Fault System

References 

Bohol Sea earthquake
Bohol Sea
Earthquakes in the Philippines
Bohol Sea earthquake
History of Bohol
Bohol Sea earthquake
1990 disasters in the Philippines